Gilbert Domingo Bulawan (August 25, 1986 – July 3, 2016) was a Filipino professional basketball player who played for the Meralco Bolts, Barako Bull Energy Cola and Blackwater Elite of the Philippine Basketball Association (PBA). He was drafted 17th overall in the 2011 PBA draft by the Alaska Aces.

College career
Bulawan played for the San Sebastian College–Recoletos men's senior basketball team from 2006 to 2010. In Season 85, He was one of the members of the San Sebastian Stags who won the title against then three-time defending champions San Beda Red Lions in a sweep 2–0.

Professional career
After Bulawan has finished his college career, he decided to apply for the 2011 PBA draft. In the draft, he was drafted 17th overall by the Aces before being traded to the Bolts. In June 2013, Bulawan was traded to Barako Bull Energy Cola from Meralco in a three-team trade that also sent Jared Dillinger and Don Allado to Meralco. 
Later in the 2014 season, Bulawan was one of the players dropped by Barako, allowing him to join the 2014 PBA Expansion Draft, where he was picked 15th by Blackwater.

Death
On July 3, 2016, Bulawan died after collapsing while on team practice with Blackwater Elite. He was declared dead on arrival at Capitol Medical Center in Quezon City. Bulawan is the youngest and very first active player to die in the PBA.

The autopsy said that Bulawan suffered from enlargement of the heart. Bulawan had a rare condition, atherosclerosis, which was rare enough that ECG tests and numerous team medical checks were unable to reveal his condition. Blackwater Elite owner Dioceldo Sy had asked the PBA for a small ceremony on its first game on the 2016 Governors' Cup for the retirement of Bulawan's jersey, #11.

PBA career statistics

Season-by-season averages

|-
| align=left | 
| align=left | Meralco
| 11 || 11.6 || .455 || .000 || .667 || 2.4 || .2 || .2 || .1 || 4.2
|-
| align=left | 
| align=left | Meralco / Barako Bull
| 13 || 5.8 || .308 || .000 || .500 || 1.1 || .0 || .0 || .1 || .7
|-
| align=left | 
| align=left | Blackwater
| 19 || 16.9 || .409 || .333 || .529 || 2.3 || .7 || .3 || .3 || 3.4
|-
| align=left | 
| align=left | Blackwater
| 9 || 8.2 || .235 || .000 || .500 || 1.9 || .0 || .1 || .0 || 1.3
|- class=sortbottom
| align=center colspan=2 | Career
| 52 || 11.5 || .393 || .167 || .556 || 1.9 || .3 || .2 || .1 || 2.5

See also
List of basketball players who died during their careers

References

1986 births
2016 deaths
Barako Bull Energy players
Basketball players from Albay
Blackwater Bossing players
Centers (basketball)
Filipino men's basketball players
Meralco Bolts players
San Sebastian Stags basketball players
People from Legazpi, Albay
Philippine Basketball Association players with retired numbers
Bicolano people
Power forwards (basketball)
Alaska Aces (PBA) draft picks